Transvaal is a historical geographic term associated with land north of (i.e., beyond) the Vaal River in South Africa. A number of states and administrative divisions have carried the name Transvaal.

 South African Republic (1856–1902), a Boer republic also known as the Transvaal in English
 Transvaal Colony (1902–1910), British colony 
 Transvaal Province (1910–1994), province of the Union and Republic of South Africa

See also
 Transvaal Park, a Russian waterpark (2002–2004)
 Golden Lions, the modern South African rugby team formerly known as "Transvaal"
 Gauteng cricket team, the modern South African cricket team formerly known as "Transvaal"
 S.V. Transvaal, a football club located in Suriname, named after the South African region
 Gauteng Division, a division of the High Court of South Africa, formerly the Transvaal Provincial Division (1902-2009)